Krisztina Téri Iskola (Krisztina Square School) a 220-year-old historic school in the I. district of Budapest, Krisztinaváros, Hungary (in 2007).

"The school started after vintage in 1787". (historic document  Hofecker, Ferencz 1887)

History 

1783 Krisztinaváros quarter had 730 inhabitants.  By such a number of inhabitants the authority of Buda city found it necessary to provide for a school, in 1787 "after the vintage it started the normal education". (Quotation by Ferencz Hofecker 1887).

The first school building was a pub building on the site of present 1–3 Gellérthegy Street.  The first teacher of Krisztinaváros was Ferenc Zonner. The school had been running in this building until 1810.

1810 The school was moved into a new building built in 1772 on the site of the present 63. Krisztina Boulevard.

1883 The present building was built on the ground enlarged towards the church.  In 1883 education started in the school building which is still existing.

1887 The one hundredth anniversary of the school.  Ferencz Hofecker 1887, Budapest Hundred-year-old History of the school of Krisztinaváros.

1945 In January 1945 the Tabán school in the Czakó Street was destroyed by a bomb. The inhabitants of Naphegy attended the school on Krisztina Square.

"… we placed our cannons in firing position on the highest part of Tabán, the Czakó Street was right behind us . … The troops took cover in the uninhabited villas in Czakó Street and" put our unlucky, exhausted horses into the garden. … We placed our observation post a little bit lower, into the school Tabán. … my commander told me he would replace the observation post to the house number 2 in Hegyalja Street because the school was striking too much, it could be bombed. He told us we would shoot the northern corner of the Margaret island over the castle area during the crossing trial of the Soviets. … In the meantime we learned that the school of Tabán, where we had our previous observation post, was hit by a chain-bomb, everybody died in the cellar. The Russians haven't got such large bombs, so it was clear tc that the attack was executed by the English." (history, see also Naphegy, Tabán, Krisztinaváros)

Between 1945 and 1958 instead of the demolished Tabán school, the inhabitants of Naphegy attended the school on Krisztina Square. In August 1958 the school in Lisznyai Street was completed on Naphegy, right near the former Tabán school.

1955 The outside renovation of the main facade of the building on Krisztina Square, the remains of the war, 1945 disappear.

1958 Larger modifications inside the building on Krisztina Square.

1958 In August 1958 the construction of the school in Lisznyai Street was completed. The inhabitants of Naphegy got an own school. 

The education in Lisznyai began in September 1958 with 7 classes of elementary school and classes of secondary school.

1970 – Central heating was laid into the school on Krisztina Square. The laboratories of Biology, Geology and practical teaching were formed.

1987 – The two hundredth anniversary of the school. The album of the two hundredth anniversary 1787–1987, Mária Ákosné Jobb headmaster.

1993 – Szent Gellért school, founded by the perish of Krisztinavárosi Havasboldogasszony.

1997 – The elementary school of eight classes was enlarged with a secondary school of four classes.

2007 – The 220th anniversary of the school. The beginning of the Wikipédia website of the school on 2 January 2007.

Alumni
Széchényi prize March 15. 2007 hungarian and Wikipedia .hu
2 fellows of the Hungarian Academy of Sciences and professors on Budapest University of Technology and Economics 
Professor at Eötvös Loránd University
Director of German Cancer Research Center Heidelberg
2 directors on research institutes of Hungarian Academy of Sciences

In the middle of the last century (1950) 

On the picture 1951/52 the traces of World War II, 1945. Renew first in 1955, 10 years after war.

Photographs today

Front side with 200 years memorial 

200 years of history (1787–1987).

Literature 

Hofecker Ferencz 1887, Budapest Krisztinavárosi Iskola Százéves Története (120 years old book, Hungarian)
Emlékkönyv a 200. éves èvfordulóra 1787 - 1987, Ákosné Jobb Mária igazgató (Hungarian)

External links 

 Meyers Lexikon — Krisztinaváros 1905
 A Krisztinaváros és a Philadelphia, SALY NOÉMI
 Digitális képarchívum
 Szent Gellért Katolikus Általános Iskola és Gimnázium
 Location on Google Maps
 Krisztina tér, near to Krisztina Church
 Near View

Várkerület
Educational institutions established in 1787
1787 establishments in the Habsburg monarchy
Education in Budapest
Buildings and structures in Budapest
Tourist attractions in Budapest
History of Budapest